There are three species of lizard native to Africa named blue-throated agama:

 Acanthocercus atricollis
 Acanthocercus gregorii
 Acanthocercus minutus